David William Harper is an American actor.

Biography
Born in Abilene, Texas on October 4, 1961, Harper moved to California in 1969. He began his acting career appearing as Jim Bob Walton, the second-youngest of seven siblings, in the made-for-television film The Homecoming: A Christmas Story (1971). When the film was turned into The Waltons television series in 1972, Harper reprised his role and remained with the series throughout its nine-season run.

When The Waltons ended in 1981, Harper appeared in the television miniseries The Blue and the Gray and the theatrical film Fletch.  Along with most of the other series regulars, Harper appeared in various Waltons reunion specials produced in the 1980s and 1990s.

Harper is not currently active in show business, but does appear at such Waltons-related functions as cast reunions, collectible and memorabilia fairs. After working at a variety of jobs, he went to school to study business.

Filmography

References

External links
 

Living people
American male film actors
American male television actors
People from Abilene, Texas
American male child actors
The Waltons
Year of birth missing (living people)